John Henry "Jack" Want  (4 May 1846 – 22 November 1905) was an Australian barrister and politician, as well as the 19th Attorney-General of New South Wales.

Early life
Want was born at the Glebe, Sydney, the fourth son of nine children of Randolph John Want, a solicitor, and his wife, Hariette, née Lister. Want was educated at Rev. W. H. Savigny's Collegiate School, Cooks River, and reportedly in Caen, Normandy, France, where he learned to speak fluent French. Want worked in his father's office but soon became bored with the legal practice, went on the land in Queensland, and afterward worked in a mine at Lithgow. Want then returned to Sydney and read in the chambers of Sir Frederick Darley. Want was called to the bar on 13 November 1869 and established a large practice as a barrister. He also engaged in many profitable commercial ventures, some of a "suspicious character".

The Mignonette

Want was a keen yachtsman, his father had been a founding member of the Royal Sydney Yacht Squadron in 1862, and in 1883 Want travelled to England to look for a new vessel. He purchased the Mignonette at Cowes, a 19.43 net tonnage, 52 foot cruiser built in 1867. The yacht could only reasonably be transported to Australia by sailing her there but she was a small vessel and the prospect of a 15,000 mile voyage hampered Want's initial attempts to find a suitable crew. However, she finally set sail for Sydney from Southampton on 19 May 1884 with a crew of four: Tom Dudley, the captain; Edwin Stephens; Edmund Brooks; and Richard Parker, the cabin boy. Parker was aged 17 and an inexperienced seaman.

On 5 July, the yacht was running before a gale at 27°10' south, 9°50' west, around 1,600 miles northwest of the Cape of Good Hope. Though the weather was by no means extreme and the vessel was not in any difficulties, a wave struck the yacht and washed away the lee bulwarks. Dudley instantly realised that the yacht was doomed and ordered the single 13-foot lifeboat to be lowered. The Mignonette sank within five minutes of being struck and the crew abandoned ship for the lifeboat, only managing to salvage vital navigational instruments along with two tins of turnips and no fresh water. There have been various theories about the structural inadequacies of the yacht that led to such a catastrophic failure in routine weather.

The crew were adrift for 24 days and resorted to cannibalism, with Parker being killed and eaten and Dudley and Stephens later prosecuted in England in a landmark case.

Political career

Lower house
Want was a candidate for the New South Wales Legislative Assembly seat of Gundagai at the 1884 by-election, but was unsuccessful. Want was successful at the 1885 election, His parliamentary skills were recognised and he became Attorney-General in the first ministry of George Dibbs (October to December 1885) and in the Patrick Jennings ministry (February 1886 to January 1887).

He was a staunch free-trader and with the emergence of political parties in 1887 could not continue to work with Dibbs and Jennings who had formed the Protectionist Party, but neither could he work under Henry Parkes who led the bulk of free traders. Want stood as an independent free trade candidate at the 1887 election where he was re-elected. For a while he formed a small corner party which he facetiously referred to as "the home for lost dogs".

In January 1889 Want moved to adjourn the Assembly, so as to censure the appointment of William Meeke Fehon as one of the Railway Commissioners, and the motion was carried 37 to 23. The then premier, Sir Henry Parkes, treated as a vote of no confidence and resigned. Want was sent for by the governor but declined the task of forming a ministry, with the Governor, Lord Carrington accepting his recommendation to call for George Dibbs to form his second ministry. Dibbs never commanded a majority on the floor of the Assembly and almost immediately parliament was dissolved and an election called. For the resulting election Want was a candidate for Paddington, standing as an independent free trader, despite his views on Parkes and his role in moving for the adjournment of the house, and was the first elected of four members. In May 1891 four free traders, Want, George Reid, John Haynes and Jonathan Seaver, voted against the fifth Parkes Ministry in a motion of no confidence, which was only defeated by the casting vote of the Speaker. Whilst the government survived the motion, parliament was dissolved on 6 June 1891 and his opposition to Parkes meant that Want reverted to standing as an independent free trade candidate for the 1891 election. He was the second elected of four members. He was not anxious for office and temporarily retired from politics in 1894.

Want was appointed  a Queen's Counsel in 1887, and had an immense practice particularly in jury trials, both civil (nisi prius) and criminal cases. No other barrister of his period in Australia earned more in fees or had a greater reputation.

Upper house
Want was nominated to the New South Wales Legislative Council in 1894 and from 18 December 1894 until April 1899 (apart from 10 weeks in 1898) was attorney-general in the ministry of George Reid. Want returned to politics partly because he wanted to keep the free trade party together and partly because he had always been opposed to Federation, and could carry on the fight better in parliament. He believed in the pre-eminence of his own colony, New South Wales, and he feared that under any kind of union it would lose its position. How strongly he felt can be seen by a quotation from one of his speeches: "I would rather see almost anything than see this hydra-headed monster called federation basking in its constitutional beastliness--for that is what it is--in this bright and sunny land. ... I was the first public man to assert my intention of opposing to the bitter end any system of federation, because there can be none which would not involve the surrender of our independence and liberty". In 1897, in the face of a ferocious rear guard action by Edward Barton, Want successfully steered through the Legislative Council, a requirement that the 1898 referendum on Federation receive at least 80,000 Yes votes (or 50 percent of the electorate) to be deemed successful. Want was still a member of Reid's ministry on 28 March 1898 when Reid made his famous Yes-No speech on the referendum, and could not understand how his leader could conclude without asking his hearers to vote against Federation, which Reid's very speech had shown to be "rotten, weak, and unfair". Want resigned from the ministry a few days later, and successfully led the No campaign against Federation. After the defeat of the first referendum, Want rejoined the ministry as Attorney General, but effectively abdicated his role of leader of the opposition to Federation. In January 1899 Want left Australia for an extended journey to Europe via the Suez Canal, just as Australia's premiers were to meet and decide on a second referendum on a somewhat revised federal constitution. The upshot was that the Attorney General of New South Wales - the minister responsible for the provision of expert advice on the Constitution - was only to learn of the premiers decision when a copy of the Daily Graphic reached him on his desert wanders through Egypt. He resigned from the ministry in the following April.  With no obvious cause, Want was absent from the campaign over the second referendum held in June 1899, when New South Wales voted in favour of federation. Want's abdication of his responsibility and role in the struggle over Federation remains mysterious.

Later life
Want continued to fight for the rights of his state after Federation, and protested the basing of the new High Court of Australia in Melbourne. He was never held office again. He died of appendicitis on 22 November 1905.

Personality and assessment
Want was over six feet (180 cm) in height, had a rugged jaw and flashing eyes. He was "flamboyant and ostentatious, usually going by the name of "Jack" or "Jimmy" It was said of him that he was "as honest and honourable as he was bluff and unconventional, a generous foeman and a true friend". In politics he found it impossible to be a party man, and although a capable administrator he had little ambition. Want could have been Premier in 1889 but let the Governor know he would be 'damned' if he would accept the appointment, and he twice declined the position of Chief Justice. He felt strongly only on the question of federation. He was, however, a great advocate unequalled in his presentation of his evidence to the jury, taking it into his confidence with an appealing frankness, emphasizing the strong points of his case, and gently sliding over its weaknesses. He used his wide knowledge of human nature with great effectiveness both in his addresses to the jury and in cross-examination, in which he was a master. In arguing before the full court he could adapt his methods to his audience, and though like so many great advocates not really a great lawyer his knowledge was sufficient for his purposes. He was married twice and left a widow, there were no children.

References

 

1846 births
1905 deaths
Members of the New South Wales Legislative Assembly
Members of the New South Wales Legislative Council
Attorneys General of the Colony of New South Wales
Australian King's Counsel
Politicians from Sydney
Deaths from appendicitis
19th-century Australian politicians